Los Molinos is a municipality of the Community of Madrid, Spain. There is a wine, also called Los Molinos, which originates from the same place.

References 

Municipalities in the Community of Madrid